Blanca María Solís Rodas (born 30 April 1996) is a Mexican professional football forward who currently plays for Juárez of the Liga MX Femenil.

Honours

Club
UANL
Liga MX Femenil: Clausura 2018
Liga MX Femenil: Clausura 2019

References

External links
 
 

1996 births
Living people
Mexican women's footballers
Footballers from Chiapas
Mexican footballers
People from Tuxtla Gutiérrez
Liga MX Femenil players
Tigres UANL (women) footballers
Women's association football forwards